Philip David Ochs (December 19, 1940 – April 9, 1976) was an American songwriter and protest singer (or, as he preferred, a topical singer). Ochs was known for his sharp wit, sardonic humor, political activism, often alliterative lyrics, and distinctive voice. He wrote hundreds of songs in the 1960s and 1970s and released eight albums.

Ochs performed at many political events during the 1960s counterculture era, including anti-Vietnam War and civil rights rallies, student events, and organized labor events over the course of his career, in addition to many concert appearances at such venues as New York City's Town Hall and Carnegie Hall. Politically, Ochs described himself as a "left social democrat" who became an "early revolutionary" after the protests at the 1968 Democratic National Convention in Chicago led to a police riot, which had a profound effect on his state of mind.

After years of prolific writing in the 1960s, Ochs's mental stability declined in the 1970s. He had a number of personal problems, including bipolar disorder and alcoholism, and died by suicide in 1976.

Ochs's influences included Woody Guthrie, Pete Seeger, Buddy Holly, Elvis Presley, Bob Gibson, Faron Young, and Merle Haggard. His best-known songs include "I Ain't Marching Anymore", "When I'm Gone", "Changes", "Crucifixion", "Draft Dodger Rag", "Love Me, I'm a Liberal", "Outside of a Small Circle of Friends", "Power and the Glory", "There but for Fortune", "The War Is Over", and "No More Songs".

Biography

Early years
Phil Ochs was born on December 19, 1940, in El Paso, Texas, to Jacob "Jack" Ochs (1910-1963), a physician who was born in New York , and Gertrude Phin Ochs (1912-1994), who was from Scotland. His father was of Polish Jewish descent. His parents met and married in Edinburgh where Jack was attending medical school. After their marriage, they moved to the United States. Jack, drafted into the army, was sent overseas near the end of World War II, where he treated soldiers at the Battle of the Bulge. His war experiences affected his mental health and he received an honorable medical discharge in November 1945. Suffering from bipolar disorder and depression on his return home, Jack was unable to establish a successful medical practice and instead worked at a series of hospitals around the country. As a result, the Ochs family moved frequently: to Far Rockaway, New York, when Ochs was a teenager; then to Perrysburg in western New York, where he first studied music; and then to Columbus, Ohio. Ochs grew up with an older sister, Sonia (known as Sonny, born 1937), and a younger brother, Michael (born 1943). The Ochs family was middle class and Jewish, but not religious. His father was distant from his wife and children, and was hospitalized for depression; he died on April 30, 1963, from a cerebral hemorrhage. His mother died on March 9, 1994.

As a teenager, Ochs was recognized as a talented clarinet player; in an evaluation, one music instructor wrote: "You have exceptional musical feeling and the ability to transfer it on your instrument is abundant." His musical skills allowed him to play clarinet with the orchestra at the Capital University Conservatory of Music in Ohio, where he rose to the status of principal soloist before he was 16. Although Ochs played classical music, he soon became interested in other sounds he heard on the radio, such as early rock icons Buddy Holly and Elvis Presley and country music artists including Faron Young, Ernest Tubb, Hank Williams Sr., and Johnny Cash. Ochs also spent a lot of time at the movies. His mother did not want to hire a babysitter and instead gave her sons money to spend at the theatre. While living in Far Rockaway, the brothers saw five to six films each week, as there were three theaters in town. He especially liked big screen heroes such as John Wayne and Audie Murphy. Later on, he developed an interest in movie rebels, including Marlon Brando and James Dean.

From 1956 to 1958, Ochs was a student at the Staunton Military Academy in rural Virginia, and when he graduated he returned to Columbus and enrolled in the Ohio State University. Unhappy after his first quarter, he took a leave of absence and went to Florida. While in Miami, the 18-year-old Ochs was jailed for two weeks for sleeping on a park bench, an incident he would later recall:

Somewhere during the course of those fifteen days I decided to become a writer. My primary thought was journalism ... so in a flash, I decided—I'll be a writer and a major in journalism.

Ochs returned to Ohio State to study journalism and developed an interest in politics, with a particular interest in the Cuban Revolution of 1959. At Ohio State, he met Jim Glover, a fellow student who was a devotee of folk music. Glover introduced Ochs to the music of Pete Seeger, Woody Guthrie, and The Weavers. Glover taught Ochs how to play guitar, and they debated politics. Ochs began writing newspaper articles, often on radical themes. When the student paper refused to publish some of his more radical articles, he started his own underground newspaper called The Word. His two main interests, politics and music, soon merged, and Ochs began writing topical political songs. Ochs and Glover formed a duet called "The Singing Socialists", later renamed "The Sundowners", but the duo broke up before their first professional performance and Glover went to New York City to become a folksinger.

Ochs's parents and brother had moved from Columbus to Cleveland, and Ochs started to spend more time there, performing professionally at a local folk club called Farragher's Back Room. He was the opening act for a number of musicians in the summer of 1961, including the Smothers Brothers. Ochs met folksinger Bob Gibson that summer as well, and according to Dave Van Ronk, Gibson became "the seminal influence" on Ochs's writing. Ochs continued at Ohio State into his senior year, but was bitterly disappointed at not being appointed editor-in-chief of the college newspaper, and dropped out in his last quarter without graduating. He left for New York, as Glover had, to become a folksinger.

1962–1966

Ochs arrived in New York City in 1962 and began performing in numerous small folk nightclubs, eventually becoming an integral part of the Greenwich Village folk music scene. He emerged as an unpolished but passionate vocalist who wrote pointed songs about current events: war, civil rights, labor struggles and other topics. While others described his music as "protest songs", Ochs preferred the term "topical songs".

Ochs described himself as a "singing journalist", saying he built his songs from stories he read in Newsweek. By the summer of 1963, he was sufficiently well known in folk circles to be invited to sing at the Newport Folk Festival, where he performed "Too Many Martyrs" (co-written with Bob Gibson), "Talking Birmingham Jam", and "Power and the Glory"—his patriotic Guthrie-esque anthem that brought the audience to its feet. Other performers at the 1963 folk festival included Peter, Paul and Mary, Joan Baez, Bob Dylan, and Tom Paxton. Ochs's return appearance at Newport in 1964, when he performed "Draft Dodger Rag" and other songs, was widely praised. However, he was not invited to appear in 1965, the festival when Dylan infamously performed "Maggie's Farm" with an electric guitar. Although many in the folk world decried Dylan's choice, Ochs was amused, and admired Dylan's courage in defying the folk establishment.

In 1963, Ochs performed at New York's Carnegie Hall and Town Hall in hootenannies. He made his first solo appearance at Carnegie Hall in 1966. Throughout his career, Ochs would perform at a wide range of venues, including civil rights rallies, anti-war demonstrations, and concert halls.

Ochs contributed many songs and articles to the influential Broadside Magazine. He recorded his first three albums for Elektra Records: All the News That's Fit to Sing (1964), I Ain't Marching Anymore (1965), and Phil Ochs in Concert (1966). Critics wrote that each album was better than its predecessors, and fans seemed to agree; record sales increased with each new release.

On these records, Ochs was accompanied only by an acoustic guitar. The albums contain many of Ochs's topical songs, such as "Too Many Martyrs", "I Ain't Marching Anymore", and "Draft Dodger Rag"; and some musical reinterpretation of older poetry, such as "The Highwayman" (poem by Alfred Noyes) and "The Bells" (poem by Edgar Allan Poe). Phil Ochs in Concert includes some more introspective songs, such as "Changes" and "When I'm Gone".

During the early period of his career, Ochs and Bob Dylan had a friendly rivalry. Dylan said of Ochs, "I just can't keep up with Phil. And he just keeps getting better and better and better". On another occasion, when Ochs criticized either "One of Us Must Know (Sooner or Later)" or "Can You Please Crawl Out Your Window?" (sources differ), Dylan threw him out of his limousine, saying, "You're not a folksinger. You're a journalist."

In 1962, Ochs married Alice Skinner, who was pregnant with their daughter Meegan, in a City Hall ceremony with Jim Glover as best man and Jean Ray as bridesmaid, and witnessed by Dylan's sometime girlfriend, Suze Rotolo. Phil and Alice separated in 1965, but they never divorced.

Like many people of his generation, Ochs deeply admired President John F. Kennedy, even though he disagreed with the president on issues such as the Bay of Pigs Invasion, the Cuban Missile Crisis, and the growing involvement of the United States in the Vietnamese civil war. When Kennedy was assassinated on November 22, 1963, Ochs wept. He told his wife that he thought he was going to die that night. It was the only time she ever saw Ochs cry.

Ochs's managers during this part of his career were Albert Grossman (who also managed Dylan and Peter, Paul, and Mary) followed by Arthur Gorson. Gorson had close ties with such groups as Americans For Democratic Action, the Student Nonviolent Coordinating Committee, and Students for a Democratic Society.

Ochs was writing songs at a fast pace. Some of the songs he wrote during this period were held back and recorded on his later albums.

1967–1969
In 1967, Ochs – now managed by his brother Michael—left Elektra Records for A&M Records and moved to Los Angeles, California. He recorded four studio albums for A&M: Pleasures of the Harbor (1967), Tape from California (1968), Rehearsals for Retirement (1969), and the ironically titled Greatest Hits (1970) (which actually consisted of all new material). For his A&M albums, Ochs moved away from simply produced solo acoustic guitar performances and experimented with ensemble and even orchestral instrumentation, "baroque-folk", in the hopes of producing a pop-folk hybrid that would be a hit.

Critic Robert Christgau, writing in Esquire of Pleasures of the Harbor in May 1968, did not consider this new direction a good turn. While describing Ochs as "unquestionably a nice guy", he went on to say, "too bad his voice shows an effective range of about half an octave [and] his guitar playing would not suffer much if his right hand were webbed." "Pleasures of the Harbor", Christgau continued, "epitomizes the decadence that has infected pop since Sgt. Pepper. [The] gaudy musical settings ... inspire nostalgia for the three-chord strum." With an ironic sense of humor, Ochs included Christgau's "webbed hand" comment in his 1968 songbook The War is Over on a page titled "The Critics Raved", opposite a full-page picture of Ochs standing in a large metal garbage can. Despite his sense of humor, Ochs was unhappy that his work was not receiving the critical acclaim and popular success he had hoped to achieve. Still, Ochs would joke on the back cover of Greatest Hits that there were 50 Phil Ochs fans ("50 fans can't be wrong!"), a sarcastic reference to an Elvis Presley album that bragged of 50 million Elvis fans.

None of Ochs's songs became hits, although "Outside of a Small Circle of Friends" received a good deal of airplay. It reached No. 119 on Billboard'''s national "Hot Prospect" listing before being pulled from some radio stations because of its lyrics, which sarcastically suggested that "smoking marijuana is more fun than drinking beer". It was the closest Ochs ever came to the Top 40. Joan Baez, however, did have a Top Ten hit in the U.K. in August 1965, reaching No. 8 with her cover of Ochs's song "There but for Fortune", which was also nominated for a Grammy Award for "Best Folk Recording". In the U.S. it peaked at No. 50 on the Billboard charts—a good showing, but not a hit.

Although he was trying new things musically, Ochs did not abandon his protest roots. He was profoundly concerned with the escalation of the Vietnam War, performing tirelessly at anti-war rallies across the country. In 1967 he organized two rallies to declare that "The War Is Over"—"Is everybody sick of this stinking war? In that case, friends, do what I and thousands of other Americans have done—declare the war over."—one in Los Angeles in June, the other in New York in November. He continued to write and record anti-war songs, such as "The War Is Over" and "White Boots Marching in a Yellow Land". Other topical songs of this period include "Outside of a Small Circle of Friends", inspired by the murder of Kitty Genovese, who was stabbed to death outside of her New York City apartment building while dozens of her neighbors reportedly ignored her cries for help, and "William Butler Yeats Visits Lincoln Park and Escapes Unscathed", about the despair he felt in the aftermath of the Chicago 1968 Democratic National Convention police riot.

Ochs was writing more personal songs as well, such as "Crucifixion", in which he compared the deaths of Jesus Christ and assassinated President John F. Kennedy as part of a "cycle of sacrifice" in which people build up heroes and then celebrate their destruction; "Chords of Fame", a warning against the dangers and corruption of fame; "Pleasures of the Harbor", a lyrical portrait of a lonely sailor seeking human connection far from home; and "Boy in Ohio", a plaintive look back at Ochs's childhood in Columbus.Schumacher, pp. 110, 160, 214–215, 223–224.

A lifelong movie fan, Ochs worked the narratives of justice and rebellion that he had seen in films into his music, describing some of his songs as "cinematic". He was disappointed and bitter when his onetime hero John Wayne embraced the Vietnam War with what Ochs saw as the blind patriotism of Wayne's 1968 film, The Green Berets:

[H]ere we have John Wayne, who was a major artistic and psychological figure on the American scene, ... who at one point used to make movies of soldiers who had a certain validity, ... a certain sense of honor [about] what the soldier was doing. ... Even if it was a cavalry movie doing a historically dishonorable thing to the Indians, even as there was a feeling of what it meant to be a man, what it meant to have some sense of duty. ... Now today we have the same actor making his new war movie in a war so hopelessly corrupt that, without seeing the movie, I'm sure it is perfectly safe to say that it will be an almost robot-view of soldiery, just by definition of how the whole country has deteriorated. And I think it would make a very interesting double feature to show a good old Wayne movie like, say, She Wore a Yellow Ribbon with The Green Berets. Because that would make a very striking comment on what has happened to America in general.

Ochs was involved in the creation of the Youth International Party, known as the Yippies, along with Jerry Rubin, Abbie Hoffman, Stew Albert, and Paul Krassner. At the same time, Ochs actively supported Eugene McCarthy's more mainstream bid for the 1968 Democratic nomination for President, a position at odds with the more radical Yippie point of view.Despite their disagreements, the Yippies used several Ochs songs in their media, in particular, the anti-war "I Ain't Marching Anymore". For example, see this Yippie-produced documentary . Still, Ochs helped plan the Yippies' "Festival of Life" which was to take place at the 1968 Democratic National Convention along with demonstrations by other anti-war groups including the National Mobilization Committee to End the War in Vietnam. Despite warnings that there might be trouble, Ochs went to Chicago both as a guest of the McCarthy campaign and to participate in the demonstrations. He performed in Lincoln Park, Grant Park, and at the Chicago Coliseum, witnessed the violence perpetrated by the Chicago police against the protesters, and was himself arrested at one point.See also the documentary film Conventions: The Land Around Us at Vimeo Ochs also purchased the young boar who became known as the Yippie 1968 Presidential candidate "Pigasus the Immortal" from a farm in Illinois.

The events of 1968the assassination of Martin Luther King Jr. and of Robert F. Kennedy weeks later, the Chicago police riot, and the election of Richard Nixonleft Ochs feeling disillusioned and depressed. The cover of his 1969 album Rehearsals for Retirement portrayed a tombstone with the words:
PHIL OCHS
(AMERICAN)
BORN: EL PASO, TEXAS, 1940
DIED: CHICAGO, ILLINOIS, 1968

At the trial of the Chicago Seven in December 1969, Ochs testified for the defense. His testimony included his recitation of the lyrics to his song "I Ain't Marching Anymore". On his way out of the courthouse, Ochs sang the song for the press corps; to Ochs's amusement, his singing was broadcast that evening by Walter Cronkite on the CBS Evening News.

1970
After the riot in Chicago and the subsequent trial, Ochs changed direction again. The events of 1968 convinced him that the average American was not listening to topical songs or responding to Yippie tactics. Ochs thought that by playing the sort of music that had moved him as a teenager he could speak more directly to the American public.

Ochs turned to his musical roots in country music and early rock and roll. He decided he needed to be "part Elvis Presley and part Che Guevara", so he commissioned a gold lamé suit from Elvis Presley's costumer Nudie Cohn. Ochs wore the gold suit on the cover of his 1970 album, Greatest Hits, which consisted of new songs largely in rock and country styles.

Ochs went on tour wearing the gold suit, backed by a rock band, singing his own material along with medleys of songs by Buddy Holly, Elvis, and Merle Haggard. His fans did not know how to respond. This new Phil Ochs drew a hostile reaction from his audience. Ochs's March 27, 1970, concerts at Carnegie Hall were the most successful, and by the end of that night's second show, Ochs had won over many in the crowd. The show was recorded and released as Gunfight at Carnegie Hall.

During this period, Ochs was taking drugs to get through performances. He had been taking Valium for years to help control his nerves, and he was also drinking heavily. Pianist Lincoln Mayorga said of that period, "He was physically abusing himself very badly on that tour. He was drinking a lot of wine and taking uppers. The wine was pulling him one way and the uppers were pulling him another way, and he was kind of a mess. There were so many pharmaceuticals around – so many pills. I'd never seen anything like that." Ochs tried to cut back on the pills, but alcohol remained his drug of choice for the rest of his life.Schumacher, pp. 260, 265, 275, 301–302, 310–311.

Depressed by his lack of widespread appreciation and suffering from writer's block, Ochs did not record any further albums. He slipped deeper into depression and alcoholism. His personal problems notwithstanding, Ochs performed at the inaugural benefit for Greenpeace on October 16, 1970, at the Pacific Coliseum in Vancouver, British Columbia. A recording of his performance, along with performances by Joni Mitchell and James Taylor, was released by Greenpeace in 2009.

1971–1975

In August 1971, Ochs went to Chile, where Salvador Allende, a Marxist, had been democratically elected in the 1970 election. There he met Chilean folksinger Víctor Jara, an Allende supporter, and the two became friends. In October, Ochs left Chile to visit Argentina. Later that month, after singing at a political rally in Uruguay, he and his American traveling companion David Ifshin were arrested and detained overnight. When the two returned to Argentina, they were arrested as they got off the airplane. After a brief stay in an Argentinian prison, Ochs and Ifshin were sent to Bolivia via a commercial airliner where authorities were to detain them. Ifshin had previously been warned by Argentinian leftist friends that when the authorities sent dissidents to Bolivia, they would disappear forever. When the airliner arrived in Bolivia, the American captain of the Braniff International Airways aircraft allowed Ochs and Ifshin to stay on the aircraft and barred Bolivian authorities from entering. The aircraft then flew to Peru where the two disembarked and they were not detained. Fearful that Peruvian authorities might arrest him, Ochs returned to the United States a few days later.

Ochs was having difficulties writing new songs during this period, but he had occasional breakthroughs. He updated his sarcastic song "Here's to the State of Mississippi" as "Here's to the State of Richard Nixon", with cutting lines such as "the speeches of the Spiro are the ravings of a clown", a reference to Nixon's vitriolic vice president, Spiro Agnew—sung as "the speeches of the President are the ravings of a clown" after Agnew's resignation.Eliot, p. 216.

Ochs was personally invited by John Lennon to sing at a large benefit at the University of Michigan in December 1971 on behalf of John Sinclair, an activist poet who had been arrested on minor drug charges and given a severe sentence. Ochs performed at the John Sinclair Freedom Rally along with Stevie Wonder, Allen Ginsberg, David Peel, Abbie Hoffman, and many others. The rally culminated with Lennon and Yoko Ono, who were making their first public performance in the United States since the breakup of The Beatles.

Although the 1968 election had left him deeply disillusioned, Ochs continued to work for the election campaigns of anti-war candidates, such as George McGovern's unsuccessful Presidential bid in 1972.

In 1972, Ochs was asked to write the theme song for the film Kansas City Bomber. The task proved difficult, as Ochs struggled to overcome his writer's block. Although his song was not used in the soundtrack, it was released as a single.

Ochs decided to travel. In mid-1972, he went to Australia and New Zealand. He traveled to Africa in 1973, where he visited Ethiopia, Kenya, Tanzania, Malawi, and South Africa. One night, Ochs was attacked and strangled by robbers in Dar es Salaam, Tanzania, which damaged his vocal cords, causing a loss of the top three notes in his vocal range. The attack also exacerbated his growing mental problems, and he became increasingly paranoid. Ochs believed the attack may have been arranged by government agents—perhaps the CIA. Still, he continued his trip, even recording a single in Kenya, "Bwatue".

On September 11, 1973, the Allende government of Chile was overthrown in a coup d'état. Allende committed suicide during the bombing of the presidential palace, and singer Victor Jara was rounded up with other professors and students, tortured and brutally killed. When Ochs heard about the manner in which his friend had been killed, he was outraged and decided to organize a benefit concert to bring to public attention the situation in Chile, and raise funds for the people of Chile. The concert, "An Evening with Salvador Allende", was held on May 9, 1974, at New York City's Felt Forum, included films of Allende; singers such as Pete Seeger, Arlo Guthrie, Dave Van Ronk, and Bob Dylan; and political activists such as former U.S. Attorney General Ramsey Clark. Dylan had agreed to perform at the last minute when he heard that the concert had sold so few tickets that it was in danger of being canceled. Once his participation was announced, the event quickly sold out.

After the Chile benefit, Ochs and Dylan discussed the possibility of a joint concert tour, playing small nightclubs. Nothing came of the Dylan-Ochs plans, but the idea eventually evolved into Dylan's Rolling Thunder Revue.

The Vietnam War ended on April 30, 1975. Ochs planned a final "War Is Over" rally, which was held in New York's Central Park on May 11. More than 100,000 people came to hear Ochs, joined by Harry Belafonte, Odetta, Pete Seeger, Paul Simon and others. Ochs and Joan Baez sang a duet of "There but for Fortune" and he closed with his song "The War Is Over"—finally a true declaration that the war was over.

Decline and death

Ochs' drinking became more and more of a problem, and his behavior became increasingly erratic. He frightened his friends both with his drunken rants about the FBI and CIA and about his claiming to want to have Elvis's manager Colonel Tom Parker or Kentucky Fried Chicken's Colonel Sanders manage his career.

In mid-1975, Ochs took on the identity of John Butler Train. He told people that Train had murdered Ochs and that he, John Butler Train, had replaced him. Ochs was convinced that someone was trying to kill him, so he carried a weapon at all times: a hammer, a knife, or a lead pipe.

His brother, Michael, attempted to have him committed to a psychiatric hospital. Friends pleaded with him to get help voluntarily. They feared for his safety because he was getting into fights with bar patrons. Unable to pay his rent, he began living on the streets.

After several months, the Train persona faded and Ochs returned, but his talk of suicide disturbed his friends and family. They hoped it was a passing phase, but Ochs was determined. One of his biographers explains Ochs's motivation:

In January 1976, Ochs moved to Far Rockaway, New York, to live with his sister Sonny. He was lethargic; his only activities were watching television and playing cards with his nephews. Ochs saw a psychiatrist, who diagnosed his bipolar disorder. He was prescribed medication, and he told his sister he was taking it. On April 9, 1976, Ochs died by suicide by hanging himself in Sonny's home.

Years after his death, it was revealed that the FBI had a file of nearly 500 pages on Ochs. Much of the information in those files relates to his association with counterculture figures, protest organizers, musicians, and other people described by the FBI as "subversive". The FBI was often sloppy in collecting information on Ochs: his name was frequently misspelled "Oakes" in their files, and they continued to consider him "potentially dangerous" after his death.

Congresswoman Bella Abzug (Democrat from New York), an outspoken anti-war activist herself who had appeared at the 1975 "War is Over" rally, entered this statement into the Congressional Record on April 29, 1976:

Robert Christgau, who had been so critical of Pleasures of the Harbor and Ochs's guitar skills eight years earlier, wrote warmly of Ochs in his obituary in The Village Voice. "I came around to liking Phil Ochs's music, guitar included," Christgau wrote. "My affection [for Ochs] no doubt prejudiced me, so it is worth [noting] that many observers who care more for folk music than I do remember both his compositions and his vibrato tenor as close to the peak of the genre."

Legacy
Almost fifty years after his death, Ochs's songs remain relevant. Ochs continues to influence singers and fans worldwide, most of whom never saw him perform live. There are mailing lists and online discussion groups dedicated to Ochs and his music; websites that have music samples, photographs, and other links; and articles and books continue to be written and published about him.

Ochs's commitment to fighting against the Vietnam War started early. In 1964, he performed his song "Talking Vietnam Blues" which was "the first protest song to directly refer to Vietnam by name".

His sister, Sonny Ochs (Tanzman), runs a series of "Phil Ochs Song Nights" with a rotating group of performers who keep Ochs's music and legacy alive by singing his songs in cities across the U.S. His brother Michael Ochs is a photographic archivist of 20th-century music and entertainment personalities. His daughter Meegan Lee Ochs worked with Michael to produce a box set of Ochs's music titled Farewells & Fantasies, the title of which was taken from Ochs's sign-off on the "postcard" on the back of Tape from California: "Farewells & Fantasies, Folks, P. Ochs". Meegan has a son named Caiden Finn Potter, Ochs's only grandchild. Alice Skinner Ochs was a photographer; she died in November 2010.

In February 2009, the North American Folk Music and Dance Alliance gave the 2009 Elaine Weissman Lifetime Achievement Award to Ochs.

In September 2014, Meegan Lee Ochs announced that she was donating her father's archives to the Woody Guthrie Center in Tulsa, Oklahoma. Included are many of his notebooks, journals, videotapes of his performances, the gold lamé suit, photographs, and other documents and memorabilia that Meegan had preserved since his death.

Covers and updates

Ochs's songs have been covered by scores of performers, including Joan Baez, Bastro, Cher, Judy Collins, John Denver, Ani DiFranco, Ronnie Gilbert, John Wesley Harding, Henry Cow, Jason & the Scorchers, Jim and Jean, Jeannie Lewis, Gordon Lightfoot, Melanie, Christy Moore, Morrissey, Pete Seeger, They Might Be Giants, Eddie Vedder, and The Weakerthans. Wyclef Jean performed "Here's to the State of Mississippi" in the 2009 documentary Soundtrack for a Revolution.

In 1998, Sliced Bread Records released What's That I Hear?: The Songs of Phil Ochs, a two-CD set of 28 covers by artists that includes Billy Bragg, John Gorka, Nanci Griffith, Arlo Guthrie, Magpie, Tom Paxton, and Peter Yarrow. The liner notes indicate that all record company profits from the sale of the set were to be divided between the American Civil Liberties Union Foundation of Southern California and Sing Out! magazine.

Wood Records released an indie rock/experimental rock tribute album titled Poison Ochs: A Tribute to Phil Ochs in 2003.

In 2005, Kind Of Like Spitting released an album, Learn: The Songs of Phil Ochs, consisting of covers of nine songs written by Ochs, to pay tribute to his music and raise awareness of the artist, whom they felt had been overlooked. 

Jello Biafra and Mojo Nixon, on their album Prairie Home Invasion, recorded a version of "Love Me, I'm a Liberal" with lyrics updated to the Clinton era. Evan Greer, part of the Riot-Folk collective, later updated the song for the George W. Bush era. Ryan Harvey, also part of Riot-Folk, remade "Cops Of The World" with updated lyrics. The Clash used some of the lyrics to "United Fruit" in their song "Up in Heaven (Not Only Here)", which appeared on their 1980 album Sandinista!. During their performance on VH1 Storytellers, Pearl Jam covered "Here's to the State of Mississippi" with updated lyrics to include Jerry Falwell, Dick Cheney, John Roberts, Alberto Gonzales, and George W. Bush. In 2002, with the agreement of Ochs's sister Sonny, Richard Thompson added an extra verse to "I Ain't Marching Anymore" to reflect recent American foreign policy. Jefferson Starship recorded "I Ain't Marching Anymore" with additional lyrics by band member Cathy Richardson for their 2008 release Jefferson's Tree of Liberty.

Neil Young has cited Ochs as a major influence on his music. In a 1969 interview, Young said, "I really think Phil Ochs is a genius ... he's written fantastic, incredible songs – he's on the same level with Dylan in my eyes." In 2013, Young performed "Changes" at Farm Aid and included it in his 2014 tour set; it also is the lead track on A Letter Home, his 2014 album of covers.

In 2016, Richard Barone released his album Sorrows & Promises: Greenwich Village in the 1960s, which includes "When I'm Gone". Barone said of the project: "My favorite artist on the album is Phil Ochs. I grew up with Phil Ochs songs. I love his topical songs–and I also like his songs that are not political. He was always really good no matter what he was doing." On tour, Barone also performed "Changes".

In 2020, Welsh singer-songwriter Martyn Joseph released Days Of Decision: A Tribute to Phil Ochs containing 14 Ochs covers, as well as liner notes by Ochs' sister, Sonny.

Tributes
On learning of Ochs' death, Tom Paxton wrote a song titled "Phil", which he recorded for his 1978 album Heroes. Ochs is also the subject of "I Dreamed I Saw Phil Ochs Last Night", by Billy Bragg, from his 1990 album The Internationale, which was based on the Alfred Hayes/Earl Robinson song "Joe Hill" which Ochs helped popularize. Bragg said that recording this song was "a reassertion of my rights as a performer." Ochs also had his own, different song ("Joe Hill") about the early 20th-century union activist/songwriter. "Thin Wild Mercury," by Peter Cooper and Todd Snider, is about Ochs's infamous clash with Dylan and getting thrown out of Dylan's limo. Ochs is mentioned in the Dar Williams song "All My Heroes Are Dead", the Will Oldham song "Gezundheit", the Chumbawamba song "Love Me", and the They Might Be Giants song "The Day". The Josh Joplin Group recorded a tribute to Ochs on their album Useful Music. Schooner Fare recorded "Don't Stop To Rest (Song for Phil Ochs)" on their 1981 album Closer to the Wind. Latin Quarter memorialized him in the song "Phil Ochs" on their album Long Pig (1993).

John Wesley Harding recorded a song titled "Phil Ochs, Bob Dylan, Steve Goodman, David Blue and Me", the title a reference to the Ochs song "Bach, Beethoven, Mozart and Me". Singer-songwriter Nanci Griffith wrote a song about Phil entitled "Radio Fragile", included in her album Storms. English folk/punk songwriter Al Baker recorded a song about Ochs entitled "All The News That's Fit To Sing", a reference to the title of Ochs's first album. Cajun musician Vic Sadot wrote a song about Ochs entitled "Broadside Balladeer". Singer-songwriter Jen Cass's "Standing In Your Memory", and Harry Chapin's "The Parade's Still Passing By" are tributes to Ochs. Leslie Fish recorded "Chickasaw Mountain", which is dedicated to Ochs, on her 1986 album of that name. The punk band Squirrel Bait cited Ochs as a major creative influence in the liner notes of their 1986 album Skag Heaven, and cover his "Tape From California". The American hardcore punk supergroup Hesitation Wounds wrote a song called "P. Ochs (The Death of a Rebel)", which appeared on their self-titled debut EP in 2013. The song's lyrics reference the folk singer's life and suicide. Ochs has also influenced Greek folk-rock songwriters; Dimitris Panagopoulos' Astathis Isoropia (Unstable Equilibrium) (1987) was dedicated to his memory. On the 2005 Kind Of Like Spitting album In the Red, songwriter Ben Barnett included his song "Sheriff Ochs", which was inspired by reading a biography of Ochs. On April 9, 2009, Ochs' friend Jim Glover performed a tribute to Ochs at Mother's Musical Bakery in Sarasota, Florida.

Popular culture
Among Ochs's many admirers were the short story writer Breece D'J Pancake and actor Sean Penn. Meegan Lee Ochs, who worked as Sean Penn's personal assistant from 1983 to 1985, wrote in her foreword to Farewells & Fantasies that she and Penn discussed "over many years" the possibility of making a movie about her father; the plan has not yet come to fruition, although Penn expressed an interest in the project as recently as February 2009.

Author Jim Carroll's autobiography, The Basketball Diaries (1978), was dedicated in memory of Phil Ochs.

Ochs is mentioned in the song "The Day" from the self titled They Might Be Giants album.

On the cover of The Go-Betweens' The Lost Album, Grant McLennan wore a shirt with the words "Get outta the car, Ochs", a reference to the limousine incident involving Ochs and Dylan.

The 1994 film Spanking the Monkey makes reference to Ochs and his suicide.

Ochs is mentioned in the Stephen King novels The Tommyknockers (1987) and Hearts in Atlantis (1999).

In the 2019 novel Revolutionaries by Joshua Furst, based on the life of Abbie Hoffman, Ochs appears as a character under his own name.

Ochs is mentioned in David Bowie's 2013 song "(You Will) Set the World on Fire" on The Next Day album.

Films
Michael Korolenko directed the 1984 biographical film Chords of Fame, which featured Bill Burnett as Ochs. The film included interviews with people who had known Ochs, including Yippies Abbie Hoffman and Jerry Rubin, manager Harold Leventhal, and Mike Porco, the owner of Gerde's Folk City. Chords of Fame also included performances of Ochs songs by folk musicians who knew him, including Bob Gibson, Pete Seeger, Tom Paxton, Dave Van Ronk, and Eric Andersen.

Filmmaker Ken Bowser directed the documentary film Phil Ochs: There but for Fortune, which premiered at the 2010 Woodstock Film Festival in Woodstock, New York. Its theatrical run began on January 5, 2011, at the IFC Theater in Greenwich Village, New York City, opening in cities around the US and Canada thereafter. The film features extensive archival footage of Ochs and many pivotal events from the 1960s civil rights and peace movements, as well as interviews with friends, family and colleagues who knew Ochs through music and politics. The PBS American Masters series opened its 2012 season with an edited version of the film.

Experimental filmmaker Phil Solomon named his 2007 experimental film Rehearsals for Retirement after Ochs' 1969 song of the same name.

Professional affiliations
 Ochs was a member of the American Federation of Television and Radio Artists, which is affiliated with the AFL–CIO.
 The music publishing company Ochs formed with Arthur Gorson, Barricade Music, was an ASCAP company.

Discography

Studio albums and live recordings

 All the News That's Fit to Sing (Elektra, 1964)
 I Ain't Marching Anymore (Elektra, 1965)
 Phil Ochs in Concert (Elektra, 1966)
 Pleasures of the Harbor (A&M, 1967)
 Tape from California (A&M, 1968)
 Rehearsals for Retirement (A&M, 1969)
 Greatest Hits (A&M, 1970)
 Gunfight at Carnegie Hall (A&M Canada, 1974)
 There and Now: Live in Vancouver 1968 (Rhino, 1991)
 Live at Newport (Vanguard, 1996)
 Amchitka (Greenpeace, 2009)
 Live Again! (RockBeat, 2014)
 Live in Montreal 10/22/66 (Rockbeat, 2017)

 See also 
 Counterculture of the 1960s
 List of anti-war songs
 List of peace activists
 List of songs recorded by Phil Ochs
 Robyn Ochs, his niece and a bisexual activist

References
 Citations 

 General bibliography 

 
 
 
 
 
 
 
 
 
 

Further reading
 
 
 
 
 
 
 Phil Ochs "Cosmic Baseball" Page

External links

 The Phil Ochs Papers at the Woody Guthrie Center
 Phil Ochs web pages includes lyrics, discography, images, &c.
 Celebrating Phil Ochs includes lyrics, chords, personal recollections, and much more 
 Excerpts from the Testimony of Phil Ochs at the Chicago Eight Trial
 Vic Sadot, Phil Ochs' FBI File, Broadside Magazine Phil Ochs: The Life and Legacy of a Legendary American Folk Singer – video report by Democracy Now!''
 Sonny Ochs, interviewed about Phil Ochs, Culture Shocks with Barry Lynn, March 23, 2011.
 
 
 Phil Ochs Memorial Celebration (Philadelphia, May 31, 1977) (video part 1) (video part 2)

 
1940 births
1976 deaths
1976 suicides
20th-century American guitarists
20th-century American male singers
20th-century American singers
A&M Records artists
American acoustic guitarists
American anti–Vietnam War activists
American civil rights activists
American folk guitarists
American folk singers
American male guitarists
American male singer-songwriters
American pacifists
American people of Scottish descent
American socialists
Counterculture of the 1960s
Elektra Records artists
Folkways Records artists
Jewish American musicians
Jewish American songwriters
Jewish folk singers
Jewish pacifists
Jewish socialists
Ohio State University alumni
People from El Paso, Texas
People from Far Rockaway, Queens
People from Greenwich Village
People from Perrysburg, New York
People with bipolar disorder
Political music artists
Singer-songwriters from New York (state)
Singer-songwriters from Texas
Staunton Military Academy alumni
Suicides by hanging in New York City
Vanguard Records artists
Yippies